Break out the Battle Tapes is the debut album from Wired All Wrong, a duo made up of Matt Mahaffey of Self and Jeff Turzo of God Lives Underwater. The album is notable for its unique production, particularly for its creative methods of editing explicit words. According to Turzo, this was done largely because he doesn't want to expose his young son to the harsh language on a few of the band's songs. There has been some backlash against this decision, but the band currently has no plans of releasing an explicit version of the album. Turzo has said that the songs that are edited will be released freely on the internet at some point for the fans that want them.

The album was dedicated to the memory of Steve "Rocker" Richards, Michael Mahaffey, David Reilly, and Tim Turzo.

The song "15 Minutes" was used as the theme song for the Real World/Road Rules Challenge: The Gauntlet 3.

The song "Lost Angeles" is part of the soundtrack to Burnout Dominator. An instrumental version of the song is heard in trailers for Burnout Paradise.

Critical reception
The Aquarian wrote that "the whole affair smacks of a cynical cash grab from a couple guys trying too hard to prove their relevance ... [it's] future fodder for the bargain bins." Phoenix New Times called the album "brimming with danceable opiate beats, scratchy industrial guitars, simultaneously dreamy and doomy keys, and vocals that swing between soulful falsetto and grimy rap."

Track listing

Personnel
Mixing - Sean Beaven (tracks: 1,6,7,8,10), Jeff Turzo (tracks: 3,4,5), Matt Mahaffey (track: 9), Dave Way (track: 2)
Mastering - Tom Baker
Percussion - Scott Garrett (tracks: 4,10)
Additional Engineer - Tom Davidson (track: 8)
Additional Mixing - Greg Koller (track: 4)
Additional Production - Greg Yingling (tracks: 1,2,4,7,8)

References

2006 debut albums
Wired All Wrong albums